B86 may refer to :
 Sicilian Defence, Scheveningen Variation, according to the list of chess openings
 Bundesstraße 86, a German road
 Villacher Straße, an Austrian road
 B-86 (Michigan county highway)
 Bphone B86, a smartphone made by Bkav in Vietnam